Mayte Vilán (born October 5, 1970) is a Cuban-born actress, who has starred in both English-language and Spanish-language television and film.  She played Yolanda in the 1996 film Azúcar Amarga, and starred in the 2004 television series Mesa para tres and the 2007 series Pecados Ajenos. Mayte went to Hialeah High School in Florida.

References

External links

Cuban film actresses
Cuban television actresses
1970 births
Living people
21st-century Cuban actresses